Migration is the sixth studio album by British DJ and record producer Simon Green, performing under the name Bonobo. It was released on 13 January 2017.

Background 
Migration was primarily written and recorded while Green was still on tour for his previous album, The North Borders. After the completion of the tour, Green completed a move from New York City to the Echo Park neighborhood of Los Angeles. The move, as well as the travelling for the tour and the deaths of some family members, led Green to contemplate on themes of identity, migration, and the environment. Because the tour for The North Borders consisted of approximately 175 shows across three continents for about eighteen months, the music for Migration was mainly created on a laptop as opposed to the studio environments of Green's previous albums.

Artwork 
Neil Krug served as the art director for the album. Green had tasked Krug to create artwork that was "beautifully sinister". Krug and Green decided that the artwork should be ambiguous and tease a thematically darker narrative. As a result, the artwork, which was captured in four hours, depicts the "Martian" landscapes of the Mojave Desert. The images were then digitally manipulated to add as much color as possible "without being ridiculous".

Release 
The lead single, "Kerala", was released on 3 November 2016. The music video features Gemma Arterton attempting to run away from a meteor in a London suburb. "Break Apart" was released next on 6 December 2016. The third single, "No Reason", was released on 10 January 2017. The album was released by Ninja Tune on 13 January 2017.

As of 12 July 2017, Migration has sold 16,000 copies in the United States.

An alternative music video for "Break Apart" was released on 25 October 2017.

Critical reception 

Upon release, Migration received positive reviews by music critics. At Metacritic, which assigns a normalized rating out of 100 to reviews from mainstream publications, the album received an average score of 77, based on twenty reviews, indicating "generally favorable reviews".

Stephen Worthy of Mixmag called the album a "music-making masterclass" and praised its political themes and undertones. Writing for Exclaim!, Daryl Keating also highlighted the album's thematic elements: "Bonobo questions the very nature of home... The result is an extremely reflective record, just a few shades more tranquil than his last two albums, but easily matching their well-produced splendour."

Some reviewers criticized the album for being unenterprising and too similar to Green's previous album, The North Borders. Andrew Ryce of Resident Advisor contrasted the album's themes with its cautious style, writing, "But rather than taking his sound anywhere, Migration stays put." In a mixed review for The Observer, Emily Mackay similarly criticized the album, calling it "a sonically rich album, perfect for gazing dreamily out of windows at passing landscapes, even if it doesn't reach any new destinations".

Accolades
Migration was nominated for Best Dance/Electronic Album at the 60th Annual Grammy Awards, though the award ultimately went to Kraftwerk for 3-D The Catalogue. The lead track "Bambro Koyo Ganda" was nominated for Best Dance Recording, which was ultimately won by LCD Soundsystem for "Tonite". The album won the Album of the Year award at the 2017 Electronic Music Awards.

Track listing

Charts

Year-end

Certifications

References

External links 
 Migration on Bandcamp

2017 albums
Bonobo (musician) albums
Ninja Tune albums